Syeda Mahpara Shahid Bukhari, known as Syeda Mahpara or Mahpara Shahid (born 8 July 1993), is an international footballer from Pakistan. She is the goalkeeper of the Pakistan women's national football team, and represents WAPDA at club level.

Club career
She started her career with Young Rising Stars F.F.C. as a defender in 2007. She switched to goalkeeping in 2008.

She joined Balochistan United WFC in 2013, and was part of the winning team at the 2014 National Women Football Championship. She was also awarded the Best Goalkeeper trophy and a prize of Rs. 1 lakh.

In January 2017, she, along with teammate Zulfia Nazeer, signed up with Dubai-based Rossoneri Football Club for IFA women's football league in the UAE. They made their debuts against Arsenal Women Football Club in Dubai.

She joined WAPDA after her return to the country.

International career
Mahpara was the first-ever goalkeeper of Pakistan women's national football team, making her debut in 2010 against India at the South Asian Games in Dhaka. She was a member of the national team which participated in the third SAFF Women's Championship held Islamabad, Pakistan. She played in all three games (vs. Sri Lanka, Nepal and Bhutan) at that tournament.

Career statistics

International statistics

Honours

Young Rising Stars 
National Women Football Championship: 2008, 2010, 2011, 2012, 2013

Balochistan United 

 National Women Football Championship: 2014

Individual 

 National Women Football Championship Best Goalkeeper: 2010, 2011, 2012, 2013, 2014, 2018, 2020

References

Pakistani women's footballers
Pakistan women's international footballers
Living people
1993 births
Footballers from Karachi
Balochistan United W.F.C. players
Young Rising Stars F.F.C. players
Women's association football goalkeepers